Goodenia berringbinensis  is a species of flowering plant in the family Goodeniaceae and is endemic to Western Australia. It is an annual herb with lance-shaped leaves mostly at the base of the plant, and loose thyrses of yellow flowers.

Description

Taxonomy and naming
Goodenia berringbinensis was first formally described in 1990 by Roger Charles Carolin in the journal Telopea from material collected by Charles Gardner in the bed of Berringbine Creek on Belele Station in 1945. The specific epithet (berringbinensis) refers to the type location.

Distribution and habitat
This goodenia grows along watercourses in scattered locations in the Coolgardie, Gascoyne, Murchison, Pilbara and Yalgoo biogeographic regions of Western Australia.

Conservation status
Goodenia berringbinensis is classified as "Priority Four" by the Government of Western Australia Department of Parks and Wildlife, meaning that it is rare or near threatened.

References

berringbinensis
Eudicots of Western Australia
Plants described in 1990
Taxa named by Roger Charles Carolin